Barton Green is a village in Staffordshire, England. For population details taken at the 2011 census see Barton-under-Needwood

Villages in Staffordshire